Major General Charles Grey raided the Massachusetts communities of New Bedford, Fairhaven, and Martha's Vineyard in September 1778 as part of British operations in the American Revolutionary War. The raid was one of the first in a series between 1778 and 1781 executed by the British against American coastal communities.

Grey's force of 4,000 was originally intended as a relief force for the British garrison that was briefly besieged at Newport, Rhode Island, but they arrived after the Americans had retreated. They were diverted for raiding by British army officer General Sir Henry Clinton. On September 5 and 6, Grey raided New Bedford and Fairhaven, encountering significant resistance only in Fairhaven. His troops destroyed storehouses, shipping, and supplies in New Bedford, where they met with light resistance from the local militia; they damaged fewer American holds at Fairhaven where militia resistance had additional time to organize. He then sailed for Martha's Vineyard, which was undefended. Between September 10 and 15, its residents surrendered 10,000 head of sheep and 300 oxen, as well as most of the island's weapons.

Background

In December 1776, British forces occupied Newport, Rhode Island. American forces in New England were not strong enough to dislodge the garrison there, which was also supported by Royal Navy vessels that used Newport as a base. This situation changed in 1778, following the entry of France into the war, when the French and Americans agreed to embark on joint operations against the British. The French sent a fleet under the command of French Admiral comte d'Estaing to provide troops and naval support. The fleet arrived off the coast of New York City in July 1778 but found the port well-defended, and d'Estaing further believed that its bar would be too shallow for his largest ships to cross. He then sailed instead for Newport, where he and General John Sullivan prepared to besiege the British garrison.

In response to the threat to Newport, General Sir Henry Clinton ordered 4,000 men under General Charles Grey to prepare for transport to Rhode Island, while Admiral Lord Richard Howe sailed from New York to oppose d'Estaing. D'Estaing sailed out of Newport's harbor on August 10, preparing to do battle with Howe.  As the fleets maneuvered for position, a storm arose that scattered and damaged both fleets. D'Estaing then decided to abandon Newport and sailed for Boston to make repairs. By then, General Sullivan had already begun siege operations against Newport without French assistance, which prompted Clinton to order Grey's force to sail for Newport on August 26, and Clinton accompanied the force. It made slow progress, however, due to contrary winds, arriving in Newport on September 1, and the Americans had already retreated from the island after the inconclusive Battle of Rhode Island on August 29, 1778.

Rather than disembark Grey's troops at Newport, Clinton decided to pursue other objectives. His orders issued in March 1778 included instructions to raid coastal communities, destroying shipbuilding facilities and supplies. Subsequently, he ordered the fleet to sail to New London, Connecticut, a potential raiding site. He found too few ships there to merit landing, however, and ordered Grey to "proceed without loss of time to the eastward" to raid New Bedford and Fairhaven on the Massachusetts mainland, as well as the island of Martha's Vineyard.

New Bedford and Fairhaven

Early on September 4, Grey's fleet sailed for Buzzard's Bay led by the Royal Navy frigate  under Captain Robert Fanshawe. They encountered Lord Howe's fleet en route, and the earl agreed to remain near Block Island until the raids were completed. The Carysfort arrived in Buzzard's Bay that afternoon but managed to strike rocks—twice; however, neither incident was serious, and the fleet proceeded up the Acushnet River toward New Bedford and Fairhaven. That evening, Grey landed his troops at Clark's Point on the west bank of the river. They spent the night and the next morning destroying vessels, warehouses, and wharves "in the whole Extent of the Accushnet River". Many of the ships destroyed were prizes captured by privateers operating out of the two towns. A 38-man artillery garrison was manning a small fort on the Fairhaven side of the river (today known as Fort Phoenix), and they fired on the British ships during the evening, then spiked the fort's guns and abandoned it, leaving their colors flying. The British briefly returned fire and then destroyed the fort's guns.

Grey's troops marched around the head of the Acushnet River and camped on the eastern banks. The following day, they embarked on their boats, but General Grey decided that Fairhaven should also be raided. Concurrently, militia were beginning to arrive to defend Fairhaven, with Major Israel Fearing taking command from an elderly colonel who was reluctant to pursue an active defense. The British approached Fairhaven on the morning of September 6, and Fearing arrayed about 150 men between the village and their landing point. The British set fire to a few nearby buildings and then headed for the village. At this point, Fearing's men unleashed a withering volley of musket fire, and the British precipitately retreated to their boats.

Martha's Vineyard
Grey sent his aide Captain John André to New York to request transports for livestock, then set sail for Martha's Vineyard.  Contrary winds slowed the fleet's progress, and it did not reach the harbor at Holmes Hole (present-day Vineyard Haven) until September 10.  Because of the bad winds, Grey abandoned the idea of raiding Nantucket and focused on acquiring livestock on Martha's Vineyard.

A deputation of three citizens came to the Carysfort to see what the British wanted, and Grey made his demands: he wanted the militia's weapons, any public funds, 300 oxen, and 10,000 sheep.  He threatened to land his troops and seize these items if they were not delivered up by the defenseless islanders.  After two days, the islanders had driven 6,000 sheep and 130 oxen to the fleet.  Not satisfied with this progress, Grey landed small contingents of troops on September 12 to accelerate the process and to destroy vessels found in the area.  By the 14th, he had received all 10,000 sheep and 300 oxen, as well as local militia arms and £950 intended as a tax payment for the Second Continental Congress. 
Grey sailed from Martha's Vineyard on September 15, and reached New York City two days later.

Henry Franklin Norton provides an account of Grey's raid on Martha's Vineyard in The History of Martha's Vineyard:

September 10, 1778, General Grey in command of a transport of eighty-two sails and ten thousand British troops made a raid upon the Vineyard, carrying off all the sheep, swine, cattle and oxen that could be found. To oppose this wholesale spoliation the "Islanders" had no power so they submitted in sullen and despairing silence, at times even assisting to drive away the captured flocks, hoping thereby to prevent still greater waste and outrage. A very good idea of this period is given in the diary of Colonel Beriah Norton, which reads as follows:

"September 10th. -- Gen. Grey commanding a detachment of his Majesty's army arrived at Martha's Vineyard, when I waited on him on shipboard. Agreed to deliver him 10,000 sheep, 300 head of cattle; the General informed me that payment would be made for the same if they were not resisted. The General then required the stock to be brought to the landing the next day, which was punctually complied with.

"September 11th. - This day the troops landed under the command of Col. Sterling. Said Sterling then informed me that Gen. Grey had directed him to assure me that the whole stock would be paid for if they came down according to the conversation of the evening before. Sterling then informed me that a person must be appointed to appraise the stock before they would take any on shipboard. To which I agreed and we jointly agreed to. I did appoint proper persons to do that business; who were sworn by me to do their duty faithfully by the request of Col. Sterling. The stock was by this time coming down to the landing and was taken on board to the amount of 10,000 sheep and 312 head of cattle.

"September 14th. - Col. Sterling then informed me and other inhabitants of the island that he had a message to deliver to the people. Then he recommended them to meet in a field for there was not room for them in doors, accordingly they met to the amount of several hundred. He informed us that we were to apply to New York for payment for the stock that they had received. I asked the Colonel if we best send a man in the fleet at this time for the payment to which the Colonel replied, we might if we chose but he recommended us to wait a little time before application was made.

"September 15th. -- The fleet sailed for New York."

It must seem to the reader that this Colonel Beriah Norton was a traitor to his own people, but what could he do but give in to Grey's command! Grey had the force and the power and could have destroyed the towns on the island in half a day, and would have done so if they had resisted in any way. In the diary, September 12th and 13th are omitted. Those were the days when the British troops were ravaging the island from Edgartown to Gay Head.

A man was sent to New York to receive payment for the stock, but Grey had forgotten that he had ever stopped at Martha's Vineyard. Colonel Beriah Norton made two special trips to London for the same purpose, and at one time he was given a hearing in Parliament. Very little was accomplished in these two trips to England.

Aftermath

Grey's report on the expedition lists one man killed, four wounded, and sixteen missing.  He reported that the defenders had four men killed; he also took sixteen prisoners in New Bedford to exchange for his missing.  The raid was followed by others (not led by Grey): one against Little Egg Harbor, New Jersey in October 1778, and two in 1779 against communities on Chesapeake Bay and the Connecticut shore.  In 1781 a raiding expedition led by turncoat General Benedict Arnold began the decisive Yorktown campaign in Virginia; Arnold also led another raid in September 1781 against New London and Groton, Connecticut (not far from where he grew up) that was notorious for its severity.

In New Bedford eleven houses, 21 shops, 34 ships of various size, and one ropewalk were destroyed, along with goods and naval stores.  Estimates of the damage done there and at Fairhaven ranged from £20,000 to nearly £100,000, the most costly damage was to ships and goods.  The residents of Martha's Vineyard petitioned for compensation of over £10,000 due to the losses incurred in the raid.  General Clinton's successor, Sir Guy Carleton made payment of £3,000 against these claims.

The fort at the mouth of the Acushnet River was rebuilt and named Fort Phoenix.  It was manned in the War of 1812, and is now listed on the National Register of Historic Places.

Notes

References

Battles of the American Revolutionary War in Massachusetts
Battles in the Northern Coastal theater of the American Revolutionary War after Saratoga
Battles involving Great Britain
Battles involving the United States
New Bedford, Massachusetts
History of Bristol County, Massachusetts
History of Dukes County, Massachusetts
Fairhaven, Massachusetts
Martha's Vineyard
1778 in Massachusetts
Conflicts in 1778